Anthonomus tenebrosus is a flowerbud weevil native to South America.

Anthonomus tenebrosus is being investigated for use a potential biocontrol agent for tropical soda apple (Solanum viarum), mainly in the Southeastern United States.

References

Curculioninae
Beetles described in 1843
Beetles of South America